Erythraeus (Zaracarus) passidonicus is a species of mite belonging to the family Erythraeidae, first described from Greece.

References

Further reading
Haitlinger, R. "New records of mites (Acari: Prostigmata: Erythraeidae, Trombidiidae) from Turkey, with descriptions of four new species." Zeszyty Naukowe Uniwersytetu Przyrodniczego we Wrocławiu-Biologia i Hodowla Zwierzat 60.577 (2010): 49-61.
Mayoral, Jaime G., and Pablo Barranco. "A new species of the genus Erythraeus Latreille, 1806 (Acari: Erythraeidae) from the Gypsum Karst of Sorbas in the south of Spain." Revista Ibérica de Aracnología 16 (2008): 113-117.

Trombidiformes
Arachnids of Europe